The Maloof Skate Park, or Maloof Money Cup Washington DC Skate Park, opened to the public in March 2012. It is a 15,000-square-foot skate park, located next to RFK Stadium in Washington, D.C.  The park was designed by Pro Skater Geoff Rowley and Joe Ciaglia's team at California Skateparks.

The Maloof Money Cup builds skate parks for public use in exchange for hosting access, and the total cost of building the DC Skate park is estimated to be nearly a million dollars.

After the inaugural Maloof Money Cup DC in September 2011 was hosted here, the park remained closed to the public, and although there were rumors of deconstruction, the park is now open for day use.  Landscaping around the park has been completed, although the parking lot pavement is abysmal.

The design of the park was inspired by features in Freedom Plaza, and the urban architecture up and down Pennsylvania Avenue.  Features include a great number of steps, jumps, ledges, rails, a 4 ft quarter pipe, and a 5–6 ft vert wall. The features vary in size and the park is suitable for beginner to advanced skaters.

References

External links
Official Site at Washington Convention and Sports Authority

Skateparks in the United States
Sports venues in Washington, D.C.